Eleazar Wheelock (April 22, 1711 – April 24, 1779) was an American Congregational minister, orator, and educator in Lebanon, Connecticut, for 35 years before founding Dartmouth College in New Hampshire. He had tutored Samson Occom, a Mohegan who became a Presbyterian minister and the first Native American to publish writings in English. Before founding Dartmouth, Wheelock founded and ran the Moor's Charity School in Connecticut to educate Native Americans. The college was primarily for the sons of American colonists.

Early life and education
Eleazar Wheelock was born in Windham, Connecticut, to Ralph Wheelock and Ruth Huntington, who had a prosperous farm of 300 acres. He is the great-grandson of the first teacher of the first free school in the United States (see Dedham, Massachusetts), the Rev. Ralph Wheelock. In 1733, he graduated from Yale College, having won the first award of the Dean Berkeley Donation for distinction in classics. He continued his theological studies at Yale until he was licensed to preach in May 1734.

Marriage and family
Two months after beginning as pastor of a church, on April 29, 1735, he married Sarah Davenport. She died in 1746. They managed a farm in addition to his pastoring, and he was an itinerant preacher during the 1730s and '40s.

He married a second time to Mary Brinsmead, a widow with two children. In total he had eight children with his wives and two step-children.

Career
Wheelock was installed as the pastor of the Second Congregational Church of Lebanon, Connecticut, in February 1735 and served as their minister for 34 years. Wheelock also acted as an itinerant preacher during the Great Awakening, a religious revival that had begun to sweep the Connecticut River Valley around the time of his graduation from Yale. He was one of its greatest proponents in the state, serving as the "chief intelligencer of revival news".

In addition, Wheelock was deeply concerned about Native Americans in New England, whose numbers had declined rapidly due to disease, warfare and social disruption, including continued encroachment on their lands by colonists.

Wheelock "was a long-time slave owner".

Christian missionary
In 1743, Wheelock took in a student named Samson Occom, a Mohegan who knew English and had converted to Christianity in his childhood. He taught Occom for four years; the youth was a ready student, learning to read and write in Hebrew as well as deeply studying theology. After preaching for several years to the Pequot people in Montauk on eastern Long Island, Occom was ordained in Suffolk County, New York, as a Presbyterian minister. He returned to Connecticut to preach to the Mohegan and later organized Christian Indians as the Brothertown Indians.

Wheelock's success in preparing Occom for the ministry encouraged him to found a school in Lebanon, Connecticut, for Native Americans. He planned to teach the boys in both secular and Christian subjects, so they could return to their native culture as missionaries. The girls would learn "housewifery" and English skills including reading and writing. Charitable contributions from New England and England supported the Moor's Charity School, which was located on Lebanon's town green. Some students became homesick or even ill and died; few became missionaries.

Establishment of Dartmouth and presidency
After sending Occom and another minister on a speaking tour of England to raise money for the charity school, Wheelock decided to enlarge it, as well as adding college classes for the education of American colonists in the classics, philosophy, and literature. He began to search for another location for the schools. Wheelock obtained a charter from King George III on December 13, 1769. Having worked and raised funds for the education of Native Americans, Occom and the British Board of Trustees headed by Lord Dartmouth opposed the addition of the college to benefit the sons of the colonists.

Wheelock kept the lord's donation and named the college after him, as Dartmouth College. He chose Hanover, New Hampshire, for the location and became the college's president. In 1771, four students were graduated in Dartmouth's first commencement, including Wheelock's son John. While some Native Americans attended Dartmouth, it primarily served the sons of American colonists.

Wheelock died during the Revolutionary War, on April 24, 1779. He is buried in Hanover. His writings include "Narrative of the Indian School at Lebanon."

Legacy and honors
Wheelock, Vermont, in Caledonia County is named for him.
During World War II a Liberty Ship (Maritime Hull Number 0038) was named for Wheelock.  This was a C-2 cargo ship outfitted to carry 550 troops.  It participated in the Normandy Invasion and is frequently mentioned in the book The Far Shore by the American author Max Miller.

Notable descendants
Colonel Eleazer Louis Ripley Wheelock, soldier, real estate prospector, Indian agent, founder of Wheelock, Texas, Texas Ranger, surveyor, Texas pioneer.
John Wheelock, second president of Dartmouth College.
William Henry Woodward, litigant Dartmouth College Case (AKA Dartmouth College v. Woodward)
John Hall Wheelock, 20th century poet.
Rachel Wheelock, 21st century poet.
Michael Wheelock, 21st century scientist
Kenny Mayne, American sports journalist.
Geoffrey Wheelock, Esteemed Insurance professional
Rev. Alan Bryan Conley, Fern Wheelock’s son, 1934-2020, Episcopal minister, headmaster, and champion for marginalized communities in N, S, W, and Hill Country, Texas, USA.

References

External links

 Eleazar Wheelock: The Man and His Legacy, Columbia University
 Papers of Eleazar Wheelock, Wheaton College
 "A plain and faithful Narrative of the Original Design, Rise, Progress and present State of the Indian Charity-School At Lebanon, in Connecticut" (1763)
 A Continuation of the Narrative of the Indian Charity School, in Lebanon in Connecticut, New England (1769)
 A Sermon Preached before the second Society in Lebanon, June 30. 1763. At the Ordination of the Rev. Mr. Charles-Jeffry Smith
 "Eleazar Wheelock", Infoplease
 A Brief History of Dartmouth
 "Eleazar Wheelock", Connecticut Heritage
 Dartmouth College
 Wheelock Succession
 

1711 births
1779 deaths
Presidents of Dartmouth College
Dartmouth College
Yale College alumni
American Congregationalist ministers
American evangelicals
People of colonial Connecticut
People of colonial New Hampshire
University and college founders
Clergy in the American Revolution
18th-century Congregationalist ministers
People from Hanover, New Hampshire
People from Windham, Connecticut
People from Lebanon, Connecticut
Ralph Wheelock family
American slave owners